Palmyra is an unincorporated community in Knox County, in the U.S. state of Ohio.

History
Palmyra was laid out in 1835. With the construction of the railroad, business activity shifted away from inland Palmyra, and its population dwindled.

References

Unincorporated communities in Knox County, Ohio
1835 establishments in Ohio
Populated places established in 1835
Unincorporated communities in Ohio